Adriano Aparecido Silva (12 October 1970 – 3 June 2020), better known as simply Adriano Silva, was a Brazilian politician and professor from the state of Mato Grosso.

Career
Before pursuing a career in politics, Silva worked as a professor and also held the post of Rector of the Mato Grosso State University between 2010 and 2014.

In 2014, he decided to run for a spot at the Legislative Assembly of Mato Grosso. Although he failed to be directly elected for the position, he was appointed suplente, a substitute Deputy that only takes office if a permanent or temporary vacancy within this coalition occurs.

On 4 January 2016, Silva took office as a Member of the Legislative Assembly of Mato Grosso due to a temporary vacancy. He remained in power for little less than two months and left the post on February 29, 2016.

On 6 July 2016, Silva took office as a State Deputy for the second time, once again due to a temporary vacancy. This time he remained less than one month in power and left office on August 2, 2016.

In 2016, Silva decided to run at the mayoral elections of his birth city of Cáceres. The attempt was unsuccessful as he failed to secure enough votes to win.

In 2018, Silva decided to run for a spot at the Chamber of Deputies, representing his birth state of Mato Grosso. The attempt was unsuccessful as he failed to secure enough votes for election, but once again he was appointed a suplente.

Personal life and death
At the time of his death, Silva was married and had two sons.

On 3 June 2020, Silva died from complications brought on by COVID-19 in Cuiabá during the COVID-19 pandemic in Brazil.

References

1970 births
2020 deaths
Members of the Legislative Assembly of Mato Grosso
People from Mato Grosso
Progressistas politicians
Democrats (Brazil) politicians
Brazilian Socialist Party politicians
Deaths from the COVID-19 pandemic in Mato Grosso